Christmas in Diverse City is TobyMac's first full-length Christmas album as well as his fifth studio album. It was released on October 4, 2011.

A re-release of the album, excluding a few tracks and including two new tracks 'Bring On The Holidays' and 'Can't Wait For Christmas' featuring Relient K was released in 2017 under the name 'Light Of Christmas'.

Critical reception

Christmas in Diverse City garnered a positive reception from music critics. At CCM Magazine, Grace S. Aspinwall rated the album four stars and called the album "a fun-filled romp through holiday magic." Lins Honeyman of Cross Rhythms rated the album seven out of ten and said that the release was "undeniably accomplished", noting that some listeners may not like the part-time performance by the artist. At Allmusic, Steve Leggett rated the album four stars and said that the artist was "doing what he does best, mixing rock, pop, soul, hip-hop, and urban sounds into memorable songs with an edgy but positive spirit" of the holidays. Sarah Fine of New Release Tuesday rated the release four-and-a-half stars and affirmed the album to be "the most creative" of the holiday season. At Christian Music Zine, Tyler Hess rated the album the same as Fine, writing that even though the artist steps back on the project the release is still a worthy one.

Jono Davies of Louder Than the Music rated the album a perfect five stars and highlighted how TobyMac put his own spin on the festive songs that are going to be played at holiday gathering near and far. At The Christian Manifesto, Calvin Moore rated the album three-and-a-half stars, affirming the album as "an acquired taste." Jamie Lee Rake of The Phantom Tollbooth rated the album the same as Moore, and felt that the effort "doesn't disappoint". However, Ryan Barbee and Roger Gelwicks of Jesus Freak Hideout were mixed toward the album, both rating it three stars and Barbee said the album "cannot be easily dismissed nor easily accepted." Gelwicks stated that "Pairing Christmas spirit and TobyMac's musical genius could have been a classic combination, but the outcome seems to prove otherwise. To be fair, Christmas In Diverse City does more right things than not, but given Toby's pedigree of inventive composition and pleasurable atmosphere, the middle-of-the-road result is disheartening overall."

Track listing

Charts

References 

2011 Christmas albums
Christmas albums by American artists
ForeFront Records albums
TobyMac albums